Charles Robinson (1870–1937) was a prolific British book illustrator.

Biography
Born in Islington in October 1870, London, he was the son of illustrator Thomas Robinson, and his brothers Thomas Heath Robinson and William Heath Robinson also became illustrators. He served an apprenticeship as a printer and took art lessons in the evenings. He won a place at the Royal Academy in 1892 but was unable to take it up due to lack of finances.

The first full book he illustrated was Robert Louis Stevenson's A Child's Garden of Verses (1896) which includes over 100 pen and ink drawings. It was extremely popular, going through many reprints, and generated numerous commissions. He illustrated many fairy tales, children's books and books written by Walter Copeland Jerrold and himself throughout his career. He was also an active painter, especially in later life, and was elected to the Royal Institute of Painters in Water Colours in 1932.

Robinson married Edith Mary Favatt in 1897 in Middlesex, England and they were the parents of four daughters and two sons.

Works Illustrated

Aesop Fables (1895)
Stevenson, R.L. A Child's Garden of Verses (1896)
Carrington, E. Animals in the Wrong Places (1896)
Lowry, H. D. Make Believe (1896)
Setoun, G. The Child World (1896)
Eugene Field's Lullaby Land (1897)
A. Bell Dobbie’s Little Master (1897)
B. Macgregor King Longbeard (1898)
W. E. Cule's Child Voices (1899)
William Brighty Rands Lilliput Lyrics (1899)
George Sand The Master Mosaic Workers (1899)
Friedrich de la Motte Fouqué's Sintram and His Companions (1900) 
J. J. Bell Jack of all Trades (1900)
The New Noah’s Ark (1900)
 W. Canton The True Annals of Fairyland (1900)
P. Dearmer The Little Lives of the Saints (1900)
N. Garstin The Suitors Of Aprille (1900)
Homer The Adventures of Odysseus (1900)
Aslauga’s Knight (1900)
C. Perrault Tales of Passed Times (1900)
G. Sand The Master Mosaic Workers (1900)
H. de V. Stacpoole Pierrette (1900)
E. Rhys The True Annals of Fairyland (1901)
The Reign of King Cole (1901)
A Book of Days for Little Ones (1901)
 W. Copeland The Farm Book (1901)
Claire Bridgman The Book of Shops (1902)
W. Copeland The Book of the Zoo (1902)
The Shopping Day (1902)
J. H. Burn The Mother's Book of Song (1902)
W. Jerrold Nonsense! Nonsense! (1902)
The Coronation Autograph Book (1902)
Jerrold The Big Rook of Nursery Rhymes (1903)
 Siegfried : A Romance founded on Wagner's Operas (1904)
D. W. Jerrold Fireside Saints (1904)
A Bookful of Fun (1905)
The Black Cat Book (1905)
The Book of Ducks and Dutchies (1905)
The Book of the Dutch Dolls (1905)
The Book of the Fan (1905)
The Book of the Little JDs (1905)
The Book of the Mandarinfants (1905)
The Book of the Little Dutch Dots (1905)
The Hundred Best Blank Verse Passages in the English Language (1905)
I. H. Wallis The Cloud Kingdom (1905)
The Child's Christmas (1906)
The Silly Submarine (1906)
The Book of Dolly's Doings (1906)
Bouncing Babies (1906)
The Book of Dolly's House (1906)
The Book of Dolly Land (1906)
Awful Airship (1906)
Mad Motor (1906)
K. A. Tynan Little Book of Courtesies (1906)
The Sweet Shop (1907)
The Toy Shop (1907)
The Cake Shop (1907)
Alice's Adventures in Wonderland (1907)
Evelyn Sharp The story of the weathercock (1907)
Babes and Blossoms (1908)
The Book of Other people (1908)
The Book of Sailors (1908)
The Book of Soldiers (1908)
W. Jerrold The True Annals of Fairyland in the Reign of King Aberon (1909)
Grimm's Fairy Tales (1910) 
Ruth Arkwright Brownikins and Other Fancies (1910)
J. Pope Babes and Birds (1910)
N. Syrett The Vanishing Princess (1910)
The Dolly Scouts (1911)
Frances Hodgson Burnett's The Secret Garden (1911)
The Sensitive Plant (1911)
My Book about Australia (1912)
Alice Talwyn Morris My Book about New Zealand (1912)
William Blake Songs of Innocence (1912)
A. France Bee, Princess of the Dwarfs (1912)
Emily Handasyde The Four Gardens (1912)
Jerrold The Big Book of Fables (1912)
Pope Babes and Beasts (1912)
H. Fielding Margaret’s Book (1913)
W. Minnion Topsy Turvey (1913)
Perrault Fairy Tales (1913)
E. T. Thurston The Open Window (1913)
Oscar Wilde The Happy Prince (1913)
A. E. Castle Our Sentimental Garden (1914)
A. T. Morris A Child’s Book of Empire (1914)
Songs and Sonnets by William Shakespeare (1915)
Robert Herrick (1915)
E. Sharp What Happened at Christmas (1915)
The Story of Prince Ahmed (1915)
he Little Hunchback Zia (1916)
Phyllis Austin The Goldfish Bowl (1918)
Bridget’s Fairies (1919)
M Elsie Gullick Teddy's Year with the Fairies (1920)
G. Rhys The Children’s Garland of Verse (1921)
G.J. Stevenson Father Time Stories (1921)
Doris and David Alone (1922)
Girvin, B. & Cosens, M. Wee Men (1923)
A.A. Milne Once on a Time (1925)
Mother Goose Nursery Rhymes (1928)
The Rubaiyat of Omar Khayyam (1928)
Jennie Dunbar Young Hopeful (1932)

Gallery

Biography 
Charles Robinson  by Leo de Freitas. London: Academy Editions; New York: St. Martins Press, 1976. .  (pbk.).

References

External links

 
 
Works by Charles Robinson at Toronto Public Library

  (mainly as Charles Robinson undifferentiated, previous page of browse report)
 

1870 births
1937 deaths
People from Islington (district)
British illustrators
British children's book illustrators
19th-century illustrators of fairy tales
20th-century illustrators of fairy tales
Members of the Royal Institute of Painters in Water Colours